Mutual aid may refer to:

Mutual aid (organization theory), a tenet of organization theories entailing a voluntary reciprocal exchange of resources and services for mutual benefit
Mutual Aid: A Factor of Evolution, a book detailing the role of mutual aid in the evolution of animals and humans by anarchist philosopher Peter Kropotkin
Mutual aid (emergency services), an agreement between emergency responders
Mutual aid, an element of social work with groups
Mutual aid society, an organization formed for the benefit of members
Billion Dollar Gift and Mutual Aid: Canada's gift of $4 billion to Britain in the Second World War

See also
Mutualism (biology), a concept of biological interaction
Mutualism (economic theory), an anarchist economic theory